Caroline Elisabeth Larsson (born in Askim, Sweden on 28 September 1986) is a Swedish singer, songwriter.

Career 
Born in Askim, Gothenburg, Caroline Larsson began writing songs when she was 16–17 years old. She also played guitar and harmonica and wrote her own material. In 2008, Larsson released her debut album In the Moment on her own label Weeki Records in association with Universal Music, which included the single "Hold on My Heart" written by Per Gessle. She opened for Manfred Mann's Earth Band for their Scandinavian tour in 2009 and in conjunction with the release of her second album Me and I in 2011, she toured jointly with Plura Jonsson, Carla Jonsson from Eldkvarn and Anders Ekborg. In the autumn the same year she recorded a tribute to Eva Cassidy together with Bengt Mangnusson. She released her album Rebel Thinker in 2014 produced by Amir Aly. Larsson performed the songs live together with her Music City Band, which resulted in the album Nashville Country Night: Live released in October 2014.

Discography

Albums

Live albums

Singles

References

Swedish songwriters
English-language singers from Sweden
1986 births
Living people
Swedish country singers
21st-century Swedish singers
21st-century Swedish women singers